Gastaj (also Romanized as Gostaj; also known as Gostabeḩ) is a village in Baghestan Rural District, in the Eslamiyeh District of Ferdows County, South Khorasan Province, Iran. At the 2006 census, its population was 353, in 122 families.

References 

Populated places in Ferdows County